Francisco Martin may refer to:

Francisco Martín (born 1955), Spanish athlete
Francisco Jesús Martín Milán, Spanish historian, writer and teacher
Francisco Martín Borque (1917–1998), Mexican entrepreneur
Francisco Martín Moreno (born 1946), Mexican writer
Francisco Martín Cordovés (1585–1676), Spanish architect
Paco Jémez (Francisco Jémez Martín, born 1970), Spanish retired footballer